is a Japanese voice actor from Saitama Prefecture affiliated with Mausu Promotion.

Roles

Television animation
Bleach (Akon, Jāji-sensei, others)
Kaze no Stigma (Shinji Yūki)
Naruto (Zaku Abumi, Zōri, Konoha no Anbu, Shura)
Naruto Shippuden (Butsuma Senju, Gotta)
Tide-Line Blue (Mayuge)

Video games
Jak II (Jinx)
Kingdom Hearts Birth by Sleep (Patrol)
Shinobido: Way of the Ninja (Hebitonbo)
Ratchet & Clank Future: A Crack in Time (Zoni)
Sonic the Hedgehog (2006 video game) (GUN soldiers, Soleanna researchers)

Dubbing roles

Live-action
Angel (Charles Gunn (J. August Richards))
Anonymous Rex (Henchman (Tim Burd))
Big Momma's House 2 (Oshima (Kevin Durand))
Cube Zero (Dodd (David Huband))
Dirty Sexy Money (Simon Elder (Blair Underwood))
Firewall (Willy (Vincent Gale))
Impact Point (Matt Cooper (Joe Manganiello))
Terminator: The Sarah Connor Chronicles (Derek Reese (Brian Austin Green))

Animation
Cars (Peterbilt)
Home Movies (Duane, Andrew Small)
Pinocchio (Stromboli)
SpongeBob SquarePants (Mr. Krabs, Mermaid Man (first voice), Barnacle Boy (second voice), Larry the Lobster, Squilliam Fancyson, Black Jack, Stanley SquarePants)

Japanese Voice-Over
Peter Pan's Flight (Pirates Dunkan)

References

External links
Mausu Promotion
 

1970 births
Japanese male voice actors
Living people
Male voice actors from Saitama Prefecture
Mausu Promotion voice actors